Kazinform is a Kazakh international news agency and one of the largest media outlets in Kazakhstan. It is based in Astana. The news agency mainly focuses on national and Eurasian news.

Romanization System 
It had its own romanization system for Kazakh which was based on Turkish Latin, in anticipation to the transition from Cyrillic to Latin which was targeted to be complete by 2025, but it was never considered by President Nursultan Nazarbayev. The president commented that the new alphabet should contain "no hooks nor superfluous dots". The new Latin alphabet approved by Nazarbayev, which contain apostrophes corresponding certain Cyrillic alphabets, received mixed reactions from the public and linguists.

By 2019, the news agency's website began to use the revised 2018 Romanization system in their Latin Kazakh-language version, eventually ditching the Turkish Latin-based system; however, Kazakh Wikipedia and Google Translate still used the agency's old Romanization system in their Latin rendition and Kazakh translation feature, respectively.

Kazak Grammar, a social media-based group of Kazakh language enthusiasts, proposed an alternative Romanization system which combines the features of the official 2018 system with the Kazinform's system, most notably the retention of Turkish vowels with diacritics. But an unexpected change in the group's direction occurred in early 2020 when the group restarted to Noqat with their new romanization arrangements which reflects the 2019-2020 revision of the alphabet.

History 
Until 1925 the news agency bore the name Orenburg-Turgay Department of ROST. It was then renamed KazROST, until it was again renamed KazTAG in 1937. President Nursultan Nazarbayev issued an order for the agency to be renamed in 1997 as KazAAG. In 2002 it was named Kazinform by the Kazakh government. Since 2008 the news agency belongs to the holding company Arna-Media.

References

External links
  

News agencies based in Kazakhstan
Mass media companies established in 1920